Facundo Bagnis (born 27 February 1990) is an Argentine professional tennis player. He has won 1 ATP doubles event at Stuttgart and 21 Challengers in singles, achieving a career-high singles ranking of World No. 55 in November 2016.

Tennis career

2011-2012: ATP debut and first win
Bagnis played in his first ATP World Tour match at the 2011 Movistar Open on January 31, 2011, losing to Santiago Giraldo in three sets,. He won his first tour-level match at 2012 Copa Claro, beating Leonardo Mayer.

2014-2016: Major debut and first win, Top 55 debut & career best year-end ranking 
Bagnis secured his biggest victory and first win at the Grand Slam level on his debut when he defeated Julien Benneteau in the first round of the 2014 French Open, winning the deciding set 18–16.

He finished the 2016 season at a career-best year-end high of No. 56.

2021: First ATP final, US Open third round
In 2021, Bagnis recorded his first ATP semifinal at the Córdoba Open, where he lost to 5th seeded Albert Ramos Viñolas in 3 sets. Two weeks later, at the Chile Open, he would go even further by recording his first ATP final, where he lost to top seed Cristian Garín.

Bagnis qualified to represent Argentina at the 2020 Summer Olympics.

At the 2021 US Open, he reached the third round of a Major for the first time in his career, defeating qualifier and fellow Argentine Marco Trungelliti.

He finished the year at a second-best year-end high of No. 76.

2022: Second consecutive top 100 year-end ranking 
He returned to the top 100 on 21 November 2022 following a Challenger title in Ambato, Ecuador, and a Challenger final in  São Leopoldo, Brazil, at a third best year-end high of No. 93.

ATP career finals

Singles: 1 (1 runner-up)

Doubles: 1 (1 title)

Challenger and Futures finals

Singles: 35 (21–14)

Doubles: 37 (21–16)

Singles performance timeline

Current through the 2022 Miami Open.

Notes

References

External links

1990 births
Argentine male tennis players
Argentine people of French descent
Competitors at the 2014 South American Games
Living people
Pan American Games gold medalists for Argentina
Pan American Games medalists in tennis
Pan American Games silver medalists for Argentina
South American Games gold medalists for Argentina
South American Games medalists in tennis
South American Games silver medalists for Argentina
Sportspeople from Rosario, Santa Fe
Tennis players at the 2015 Pan American Games
Tennis players at the 2019 Pan American Games
Medalists at the 2015 Pan American Games
Medalists at the 2019 Pan American Games
Olympic tennis players of Argentina
Tennis players at the 2020 Summer Olympics